Walter Marcelo Bustamante (born 17 February 1980 in Villa Tesei, Buenos Aires) is an Argentine football left-back currently playing for Club Atlético Sarmiento.

Bustamante made his professional debut in 2000 for Vélez Sársfield, he was loaned out to Olimpo for the 2002-2003 season and had another loan spell with Arsenal de Sarandí in 2004.

In 2005 Sena was part of the squad that won the Clausura 2005 tournament. Bustamante has made over 100 appearances for Velez in all competitions.

In 2008, he joined Banfield and in 2009 he was part of the squad that won the Argentine championship for the first time in the history of the club, featuring in every game of the Apertura 2009 championship, which they won on the final day of the season.

Honours
Vélez Sarsfield
Primera División Argentina: Clausura 2005

Banfield
Primera División Argentina: Apertura 2009

External links
 Argentine Primera statistics at Futbol XXI  
 Football-Lineups player profile

1980 births
Living people
People from Hurlingham Partido
Argentine footballers
Association football defenders
Club Atlético Vélez Sarsfield footballers
Olimpo footballers
Arsenal de Sarandí footballers
Club Atlético Banfield footballers
Argentine Primera División players
Sportspeople from Buenos Aires Province